Dušan Borković (born 16 September 1984) is a Serbian auto racing driver, two time European champion 2012 European Hill Climb Championship and 2015 European Touring Car Cup. He is a winner of the two consecutive Serbia Rally 2019 and 2020, and a champion of TCR Easter European Championship 2019.

Racing career

Karting
Borković started his karting career in 1994. He became the Yugoslavian karting champion six years in a row from 1995 to 2000.

Serbian National-Class and Hill Climbing
After karting for six years, Borković made his autoracing debut in 2002 in the Serbian National-Class.

From 2002 to 2008 Borković competed in the Serbian National-Class championship where he finished 2nd in his first season. He won the championship from 2005 to 2008.

After racing in the Serbian National-Class for six years Borković switched to Hill Climb in 2010.

Borković won the Serbian Hill Climb Championship is his first season, winning all five events in his Mitsubishi Lancer Evo 9.

The following season, Borković switched to the European Hill Climb Championship. Coming in second in his first season, he went on to win it in 2012 still driving his Mitsubishi Lancer Evo 9.

European Touring Car Cup 2013

After winning the European Hill Climb Championship in 2012 Borković switched to the European Touring Car Cup. In his debut season in European Touring Car Cup (ETCC) he took the third place in the Super 2000 class.  He took third position in both Brno races and qualifications. He had five podiums and one win. He drove the first three meetings in a SEAT León TFSI, before switching to a Chevrolet Cruze LT for the final two meetings. He had 48 points in overall standings. In front of him was Maťo Homola with 74 points and Petr Fulín in first place with 88 points.

World Touring Car Championship 2014–2015

On 20 November 2013 it was announced that Dušan Borković would race in the World Touring Car Championship. Borković would join Campos Racing driving one of their TC1 RML Chevrolet Cruze's. On 26 October 2014 he delivered his first ever podium.
In 2015 season he started with new team Proteam Racing driving a Honda Civic WTCC. Borković only drove the first round in Argentina before withdrawing from the World Touring Car Championship. His withdrawal was because Proteam Racing was not able to cater for the 30-year-old's height, as well as there being further dissatisfaction over the specification of the team's Honda Civic WTCC.

European Touring Car Cup 2015

Considering problems with the sitting position and the car, the Serbian driver decided not to continue competing in World Touring Car Championship. Dušan Borković made the decision with his team to transfer to European Touring Car Cup in Hungaroring on 2 and 3 May.  Dusan drove the newest SEAT León Cup Racer in European Touring Car Cup with his NIS Petrol Racing Team. He became ETCC champion in Single make trophy class.

Racing record

Complete European Touring Car Cup results
(key) (Races in bold indicate pole position) (Races in italics indicate the fastest lap)

* Season still in progress.

Complete World Touring Car Championship results
(key) (Races in bold indicate pole position) (Races in italics indicate the fastest lap)

Complete TCR International Series results
(key) (Races in bold indicate pole position) (Races in italics indicate the fastest lap)

† Driver did not finish the race, but was classified as he completed over 75% of the race distance.

Complete TCR Europe Touring Car Series results
(key) (Races in bold indicate pole position) (Races in italics indicate the fastest lap)

Political career
Borković received the eleventh position on the Serbian Progressive Party's Aleksandar Vučić – Serbia Is Winning electoral list in the 2016 Serbian parliamentary election. Borković is not himself a member of the party but ran as an aligned independent. The list won a landslide victory with 131 out of 250 parliamentary mandates, and Borković was sworn in as a legislator on 3 June 2016. He was a deputy member of the parliamentary committee on spatial planning, transport, infrastructure, and telecommunications and the committee on education, science, technological development, and the information society. He did not seek re-election in 2020.

References

External links
 
 
 
 

Living people
1984 births
Sportspeople from Pančevo
Serbian racing drivers
European Touring Car Cup drivers
World Touring Car Championship drivers
Members of the National Assembly (Serbia)
TCR International Series drivers
Campos Racing drivers
Comtoyou Racing drivers
TCR Europe Touring Car Series drivers